The NASDAQ Transportation Index (Symbol: TRAN) is a capitalization-weighted stock market index designed to measure the performance of all NASDAQ stocks in the transportation sector. The index was developed with a base value of 100 as of February 5, 1971. The parent index is NASDAQ Composite Index.

History
The index closed the year 1990 at 417.07. The index closed the year 1999 at 999.11. In October 2007, it hit an all-time closing high of 3,107.87. Then in March 2009, it hit a six-year closing low of 1,242.50. In March 2014 it broke the high from 2007.

Components
This list is current as of February 18, 2011.  An up-to-date list is available in the External Links section. This is an alphabetical list, and not a ranked list.

Name	                                Symbol
Atlas Air Worldwide Holdings	AAWW
Arkansas Best Corporation	        ABFS
Air T, Inc.	                AIRT
Allegiant Travel Company	        ALGT
Air Transport Services Group, Inc.	ATSG
C.H. Robinson Worldwide, Inc.	CHRW
Capital Product Partners L.P.	CPLP
Covenant Transport         	CVTI
Diana Containerships Inc.          DCIX
DryShips Inc.	                DRYS
Echo Global Logistics, Inc.	ECHO
Eagle Bulk Shipping Inc.	        EGLE
Euroseas Ltd.	                ESEA
Expeditors International of Washington	EXPD
Frozen Food Express	FFEX
FreeSeas Inc.	                FREE
SMF Energy Corporation	        FUEL
Forward Air Corporation        	FWRD
StealthGas, Inc.	                GASS
Globus Maritime Limited	        GLBS
Hawaiian Holdings, Inc.	        HA
Heartland Express, Inc.            HTLD
Hub Group, Inc.	                HUBG
J.B. Hunt Transport Services, Inc.	JBHT
JetBlue Airways Corporation	JBLU
Landstar System, Inc.       	LSTR
Marten Transport, Ltd.	        MRTN
NewLead Holdings Ltd.	        NEWL
Old Dominion Freight Line, Inc.	ODFL
Grupo Aeroportuario del Centro	OMAB
Pacer International, Inc.  	PACR
Patriot Transportation Holding	PATR
Pinnacle Airlines Corp.	        PNCL
P.A.M. Transportation Services	PTSI
Providence and Worcester Railroad	PWX
Quality Distribution, Inc.	        QLTY
Republic Airways Holdings, Inc.	RJET
Rand Logistics, Inc.       	RLOG
Ryanair Holdings plc       	RYAAY
Saia, Inc.                 	SAIA
Spirit Airlines, Inc.          	SAVE
Star Bulk Carriers Corp.	        SBLK
Seanergy Maritime Holdings Corp	SHIP
Sino-Global Shipping America, L	SINO
SkyWest, Inc.	                SKYW
TBS International plc              TBSI
TOP Ships Inc.	                TOPS
TORM A/S	                        TRMD
Universal Truckload Services, Inc.	UACL
Ultrapetrol (Bahamas) Limited	ULTR

See also

 Dow Jones Transportation Average

External links
 Yahoo! Finance page for ^TRAN

References

Nasdaq
American stock market indices
Stock market indices by industry
Transportation in the United States